King George V School may refer to:
 King George V School (Hong Kong)
 King George V School, Seremban
 King George V College in Southport, England, known until 1979 as "King George V School"
 King George V School (Gilbert and Ellice Islands)